Croc Files (also known as The Crocodile Hunter's Croc Files) is a wildlife documentary television series focusing on crocodiles first aired on cable TV channel Animal Planet. It was created as a spin-off to the original Crocodile Hunter and The Crocodile Hunter Diaries series hosted by Australian naturalist Steve Irwin and his wife Terri Irwin. Unlike its predecessor, the series was less hands-on in nature and was geared more for children. In the UK it was aired on ITV. In Australia it was aired on Network Ten.

Episodes

Season 1 (1999)

Season 2 (2000–01)

See also

List of programs broadcast by Animal Planet

References

External links
 

1999 American television series debuts
2001 American television series endings
1990s American children's television series
2000s American children's television series
1990s American documentary television series
2000s American documentary television series
1990s American reality television series
2000s American reality television series
1999 Australian television series debuts
2001 Australian television series endings
1990s Australian documentary television series
2000s Australian documentary television series
1990s Australian reality television series
2000s Australian reality television series
American children's education television series
American children's reality television series
Australian children's education television series
Animal Planet original programming
Network 10 original programming
ITV (TV network) original programming
Nature educational television series
Television series about reptiles and amphibians
Television shows set in Australia
Television shows filmed in Australia
English-language television shows
American television spin-offs
Australian television spin-offs
Steve Irwin